The Palestinian National Theatre or El-Hakawati Theatre is a Palestinian-owned theatre in Jerusalem's American Colony neighbourhood, near New Orient House. The theatre has been serving to actively encourage and promote Palestinian artistic and cultural activities and collaborates with the Palestinian ministry of culture, several United Nations organisations, and a wide range of local and international NGOs.

In 1989, guest performance by the El-Hakawati Theatre at The Public Theater, New York, was cancelled by Joseph Papp, as he said that he was afraid that the play would ""offend" Jews who "constitute a high proportion of the theater audience in any city, but especially in New York.""

See also
Al-Kasaba Theatre

History and general information
The Palestinian National Theater (PNT) plays a vital role in the Palestinian community and until recently was the only Palestinian center for culture and art in Jerusalem. Since its inception in 1984, the theatre has served to actively encourage and promote artistic and cultural activities. The PNT was founded by the Palestinian El-Hakawati Theatre Company. After one year, the management of the center was handed over to a board of directors composed of artists, writers, and notable persons in the Palestinian community.

The PNT serves as a forum for cultural and artistic activities, and is working to upgrade and rekindle interest in the arts at the national level. Its mandate goes beyond preserving Palestinian culture, folklore and tradition and includes the active search for new ideas and innovative approaches to Palestinian self-expression.

Mission and objectives 
The Palestinian National Theatre (PNT) is a Palestinian non profit cultural institution which strives to create and to develop a unique cultural life in Jerusalem, by way of producing and presenting artistic, educational and entertaining programs that reflect the aspirations of the Palestinian people.

Main projects and activities 
The PNT shall work on the basis of a national cultural policy that stems its spiritual strength from the pluralistic history, culture and heritage of Palestine.
Its aim is to raise the literary and intellectual awareness of Palestinians by expanding their horizons and developing their awareness in order to produce a community of people that have confidence and pride in themselves and respect for the differences of others.
Because children and youth represent the majority of the Palestinian people, the PNT shall give priority to programs that address this vital component of Palestinian society

Awards
The Palestinian National Theater (Hakawati) received the Yasser Arafat Award for Excellence and Creativity in 2016. It is one of the most important cultural monuments in Palestine, but as a whole the institutions of Jerusalem suffer from financial distress, resource scarcity and harassment.

References

External links
Official website

Arts organizations established in 1984
Buildings and structures in Jerusalem
Palestinian arts
Tourist attractions in Jerusalem